A crumpet is a small griddle bread made from an unsweetened batter of water or milk, flour, and yeast, popular in the United Kingdom, Canada, New Zealand, South Africa and Australia.

Crumpets are regionally known as pikelets, a name also applied to a thinner, more pancake-like griddle bread; a type of the latter is referred to as a crumpet in Scotland.

History and etymology

Crumpets have been variously described as originating in Wales or as part of the Anglo-Saxon diet, based on proposed etymologies of the word. In either case, breads were, historically, commonly cooked on a griddle wherever bread ovens were unavailable. The bara-planc, or griddle bread, baked on an iron plate over a fire, was part of the everyday diet in Wales until the 19th century.

Small, oval pancakes baked in this manner were called picklets, a name used for the first recognisable crumpet-type recipe, published in 1769 by Elizabeth Raffald in The Experienced English Housekeeper. The early 17th century lexicographer Randle Cotgrave referred to "popelins, soft bread of fine flour, &c., fashioned like our Welsh barrapycleds".

The word spread initially to the West Midlands of England, where it became anglicised as pikelet, and subsequently to Cheshire, Lancashire, Yorkshire, and other areas of the north; crumpets are still referred to as pikelets in some areas. The word crumpet itself, of unclear origin, first appears in relatively modern times; it has been suggested as referring to a crumpled or curled-up cake, based on an isolated 14th century reference to a "crompid cake", and the Old English word  ('crumpled') being used to gloss Latin , possibly a type of thin bread.

An etymology from the French language term , meaning "a paste of fine flour, slightly baked", has also been suggested. However, a correspondent to Manchester Notes and Queries, writing in 1883, claimed that the crampet, as it was locally then known, simply took its name from the metal ring or "cramp" used to retain the batter during cooking.

The early crumpets were hard pancakes cooked on a griddle, rather than the soft and spongy crumpets of the Victorian era, which were made with yeast.  From the 19th century, a little bicarbonate of soda was also usually added to the batter. In modern times, the mass production of crumpets by large commercial bakeries has eroded some regional differences. As late as the 1950s, Dorothy Hartley noted a wide degree of regional variation, identifying the small, thick, spongy type of crumpet specifically with the Midlands.

Characteristics

Crumpets are distinguished from similar sized muffins by being made from a batter, rather than a dough. Their shape comes from being restrained in the pan/griddle by a shallow ring. They have a characteristic flat top with many small pores and a spongy texture which allows butter or other spreads to permeate.

Crumpets may be cooked until ready to eat warm from the pan, but are also left slightly undercooked and then toasted. While premade commercial versions are available in most supermarkets, freshly home-made crumpets are less heavy and doughy in texture. They are usually eaten with a spread of butter, or with other sweet or savoury toppings.

While in some areas of the country the word pikelet is synonymous with the crumpet, in others (such as Staffordshire and Yorkshire) it refers to a slightly differing recipe. If differentiated from the crumpet, a pikelet is defined as containing no yeast as a raising agent; as using a thinner batter than a crumpet; and as being cooked without a ring, giving a flatter result than a crumpet. In Stoke-on-Trent, pikelets were once sold in the town's many oatcake shops and still are.  A 1932 recipe for Staffordshire pikelets specifies that they were made with flour and buttermilk, with bicarbonate of soda as a raising agent, and suggests cooking them using bacon fat.

The term pikelet is used in Australian and New Zealand cuisine for a smaller version of what in Scotland and North America would be called a pancake and, in England, a Scotch pancake, girdle or griddle cake, or drop scone.

Scottish crumpet

A Scottish crumpet is broadly similar to the crumpet of parts of Northern England. It is available plain, or as a fruit crumpet with raisins baked in, usually fried in a pan and served with a fried breakfast. It is also sometimes served with butter and jam. The ingredients include a leavening agent, usually baking powder, and different proportions of eggs, flour, and milk, which create a thin batter. Unlike a pancake, it is cooked to brown on one side only, resulting in a smooth darker side where it has been heated by the griddle, then lightly cooked on the other side which has holes where bubbles have risen to the surface during cooking.

Ireland

While now relatively uncommon in Ireland, crumpets were once produced by Boland's Bakery in Dublin during the 19th and much of the 20th centuries; Boland's recipe was subsequently used by a number of other bakeries. Irish crumpets differed from most British recipes by having a yeastless batter and being cooked on both sides, giving a smooth rather than spongy top.

See also

 Baghrir
 Blini
 Uttappam
 Lahoh
 English muffin
 List of British breads
 Tea (meal)
 Thinking man's/woman's crumpet, a slang use of the word

References

External links

 

British breads
Australian breads
New Zealand breads
Yeast breads
Pancakes